The Zapad 2009 exercise was held by the armed forces of Russia and Belarus in Belarus in September 2009. It involved a simulated nuclear attack against Poland (hitting Warsaw) and the suppression of an uprising by a Polish minority in Belarus, along with other operations.

References

External links

Military exercises involving Russia
2009 in Russia
2009 in Belarus
Zapad military exercises
Belarusian military exercises
2009 in military history
Belarus–Russia relations